Norman G. Einspruch is a professor and dean emeritus at the University of Miami College of Engineering and an elected fellow of the American Association for the Advancement of Science.

External links
University of Miami Library record

Year of birth missing (living people)
Place of birth missing (living people)
Living people
Fellows of the American Association for the Advancement of Science
University of Miami faculty
21st-century American engineers
Fellows of the American Physical Society